Simon Gillen (May 1, 1855July 6, 1918) was an American politician, farmer, attorney and jurist.  He served one term in the Wisconsin State Assembly and held a number of local offices in Sheboygan County, Wisconsin.

Biography

Born in the Town of Mitchell, Sheboygan County, Wisconsin, Gillen was a farmer. He served as chairman of the Mitchell Town Board and on the Sheboygan County Board of Supervisors in 1880 and 1881. In 1882, Gillen served in the Wisconsin State Assembly and was a Democrat. Then, in 1882, Gillen was elected Clerk of Circuit Court for Sheboygan County. In 1888, Gillen was admitted to the Wisconsin bar and was elected district attorney for Sheboygan County. In 1894, Gillen was elected county judge and served until 1898. Gillen also served on the Sheboygan Common Council in 1891 and from 1907 to 1909. Gillen died in Sheboygan, Wisconsin as a result of a stroke while working in his garden at his home.

Notes

1855 births
1918 deaths
People from Sheboygan County, Wisconsin
Farmers from Wisconsin
Wisconsin lawyers
Wisconsin state court judges
Mayors of places in Wisconsin
Wisconsin city council members
County supervisors in Wisconsin
Democratic Party members of the Wisconsin State Assembly
19th-century American judges
19th-century American lawyers